Province of Mondoñedo One of the seven provinces which existed in Galicia from the 15th Century till 1833; from that date onwards the number of provinces were reduced to four, and the entire Province of Mondoñedo was first divided into two halves and later absorbed and assimilated into the existing provinces of Lugo and A Coruña.

From the 15th Century till 1833 Galicia was divided in seven administrative provinces:
A Coruña
Santiago
Betanzos
Mondoñedo
Lugo
Ourense
Tui

From 1833 onwards, the seven original provinces of the 15th Century have been limited to just four:
A Coruña,
Ourense,
Pontevedra, and
Lugo.

See also 
 Mailoc or Maeloc was the bishop of Britonia (Britoniensis ecclesiae episcopus)
 Mondonedo City Council in the Province of Lugo.
 Diocese of Ferrol-Mondoñedo List of Districts and Parishes from Ferrol to Mondoñedo.

External links
  The Mindoniensis-Ferrolensis Province in the 21st Century (Alternatives: The Britonia Province)

 Province of Mondonedo